Emmanuel Gil Tapia (born 16 August 1986) is a Mexican footballer who plays as a right midfielder for Cafetaleros de Tapachula.

Club career
Gil started his professional career with Albinegros de Orizaba.

He played for Reboceros de La Piedad from 2011 to 2013. On 2013 Reboceros were promoted to Liga MX.

References

1986 births
Living people
Association football midfielders
Albinegros de Orizaba footballers
La Piedad footballers
C.D. Veracruz footballers
Club Puebla players
Cafetaleros de Chiapas footballers
Liga MX players
Ascenso MX players
Liga Premier de México players
Footballers from Sonora
Mexican footballers